Ingen may refer to:

 Ingen Ryuki (1592-1673), Buddhist monk
 Ingen, Netherlands, a village
 InGen, a fictional genetics company from Jurassic Park
 a part of Irish names like in Sabdh ingen Gluniarainn mac Murchada, abbess of Kildare since 1132
 Van Ingen (surname), a Dutch surname

See also
 NGEN (disambiguation)
 Engine (disambiguation)